Thorsten Schick (born 19 May 1990) is an Austrian footballer who plays as a right midfielder for SK Rapid Wien.

Career
He was part of the Young Boys squad that won the 2017–18 Swiss Super League, their first league title in 32 years.

Career statistics

Honours
Young Boys
Swiss Super League: 2017–18

References

External links

1990 births
Living people
Footballers from Graz
Association football midfielders
Austrian footballers
Austria youth international footballers
Austrian expatriate sportspeople in Switzerland
Austrian Football Bundesliga players
2. Liga (Austria) players
Swiss Super League players
FC Admira Wacker Mödling players
BSC Young Boys players
SK Sturm Graz players
SC Rheindorf Altach players
SK Rapid Wien players